Patti B. Saris (born July 20, 1951) is a United States district judge of the United States District Court for the District of Massachusetts. She is also the former Chair of the United States Sentencing Commission.

Early life and education
Saris was born in Boston, Massachusetts. She attended Girls' Latin School, and later received a Bachelor of Arts degree from Radcliffe College of Harvard University in 1973 and a Juris Doctor from Harvard Law School in 1976.

Legal career
Saris was a law clerk for Judge Robert Braucher of the Massachusetts Supreme Judicial Court from 1976 to 1977. She was in private practice with the law firm of Foley, Hoag & Eliot in Boston from 1977 to 1979, served as Staff counsel to the United States Senate Committee on the Judiciary from 1979 to 1981, and then returned to private practice with the firm of Berman, Dittmar & Engel, P.C. from 1981 to 1982.

Saris then served as Assistant United States Attorney of the District of Massachusetts from 1982 to 1986. She was Chief of the Civil Division from 1984 to 1986. From 1986 to 1989 she was a United States magistrate judge for the District of Massachusetts. She was an associate justice in the Trial Court of Massachusetts, Superior Court Department from 1989 to 1993.

Federal judicial service
On the recommendation of Senators Ted Kennedy and John Kerry, Saris was nominated as a United States District Judge of the United States District Court for the District of Massachusetts by President Bill Clinton on October 27, 1993, to a seat vacated by Walter Jay Skinner. She was confirmed by the United States Senate on November 20, 1993, and received her commission on November 24, 1993. She served as Chief Judge from January 1, 2013, until December 31, 2019.

United States Sentencing Commission
In April 2010, President Obama nominated Saris as Commissioner and Chair of the United States Sentencing Commission.  She was confirmed by the Senate on December 22, 2010 and sworn in by Justice Elena Kagan on February 16, 2011. Her term expired on January 3, 2017.

See also
List of Jewish American jurists

References

External links

1951 births
Assistant United States Attorneys
Chairpersons of the United States Sentencing Commission
Harvard Law School alumni
Judges of the United States District Court for the District of Massachusetts
Living people
Massachusetts state court judges
Massachusetts Superior Court justices
Members of the United States Sentencing Commission
People from Boston
Radcliffe College alumni
United States district court judges appointed by Bill Clinton
United States magistrate judges
20th-century American judges
21st-century American judges
20th-century American women judges
21st-century American women judges